Tetraclita is a genus of sessile barnacles in the family Tetraclitidae. There are more than 20 described species in Tetraclita.

Species
These 24 species belong to the genus Tetraclita:

 Tetraclita achituvi Ross, 1999
 Tetraclita alba Nilsson-Cantell, 1932
 Tetraclita aoranga Foster, 1978
 Tetraclita barnesorum Ross, 1999
 Tetraclita concamerata
 Tetraclita dumortieri Fischer, 1865
 Tetraclita ehsani Shahdadi, Chan & Sari, 2011
 Tetraclita floridana Pilsbry, 1916
 Tetraclita formosana Hiro, 1939
 Tetraclita hentscheli Kolosvary, 1942
 Tetraclita imbricata
 Tetraclita japonica (Pilsbry, 1916) (Japanese volcano barnacle)
 Tetraclita kuroshioensis Chan, Tsang & Chu, 2007
 Tetraclita porosa (Gmelin, 1790)
 Tetraclita reni Chan, Hsu & Tsai, 2009
 Tetraclita rubella
 Tetraclita rubescens Darwin, 1854
 Tetraclita rufotincta Pilsbry, 1916
 Tetraclita serrata Darwin, 1854
 Tetraclita singaporensis Chan, Tsang & Chu, 2007
 Tetraclita spec Nilsson-Cantell, 1931
 Tetraclita squamosa (Bruguière, 1789)
 Tetraclita squamulosa Schumacher, 1817
 Tetraclita stalactifera (Lamarck, 1818)

References

 
Maxillopoda genera
Barnacles